The Governor General's Award for English-language fiction is a Canadian literary award that annually recognizes one Canadian writer for a fiction book written in English. It is one of fourteen Governor General's Awards for Literary Merit, seven each for creators of English- and French-language books. The awards was created by the Canadian Authors Association in partnership with Lord Tweedsmuir in 1936. In 1959, the award became part of the Governor General's Awards program at the Canada Council for the Arts in 1959. The age requirement is 18 and up.

The program was created in 1937 by the Canadian Authors Association and inaugurated that November for 1936 publications in two English-language categories, conventionally called the 1936 Governor General's Awards. Administration of the awards was transferred to the Canada Council in 1959.

The winners alone were announced until 1979, when Canada Council released in advance a shortlist of three nominees. Omitted only for 1981, the advance shortlist has numbered three to six; from 1997, always five.

Winners and nominees

1930s

1940s

1950s

1960s

1970s

1980s

1990s

2000s

2010s

2020s

References

Canadian fiction awards

Awards established in 1936
1936 establishments in Canada
Fiction
English-language literary awards